Elizabeth "Beth" Kimber is an American woman and former intelligence official.

Early life
A 1984 graduate of Hamilton College, Kimber majored in French and history. She went on to the Harvard Business School Advanced Management Program.

Career
Kimber started at the CIA in January 1985.  Along the way, she was promoted to DNI Representative, Chief of Station, Deputy Director of the National Clandestine Service and Acting Deputy Director of the CIA and was the first CIA Assistant Director for Europe and Eurasia.  

Gina Haspel, then serving as head of the CIA, nominated Kimber for the Clandestine Services position as well as Sonya Holt as chief diversity and Cynthia “Didi” Rapp in the top analyst position of deputy director of analysis.  As a result, the top three directorates were headed by women. After 37 years of service  at the Central Intelligence Agency, she left the CIA in 2022 to become Vice President of Intelligence Community Strategy at Two Six Technologies.

References

People of the Central Intelligence Agency
Hamilton College (New York) alumni
Harvard Business School alumni
American women business executives
1960s births
Living people